Laccosternus grouvellei is a species of beetle in the family Dytiscidae, the only species in the genus Laccosternus.

References

Dytiscidae